Konstantin Valentinovich Makarov (Russian: Константи́н Валенти́нович Мака́ров) (1931–2011) was a Soviet Navy Fleet Admiral.

Biography 
Makarov enlisted in the Soviet Navy in 1949 at the age of 18. He served aboard diesel submarines in the Black Sea Fleet, and was appointed commanding officer of a diesel submarine in 1963. He finished the Naval Academy in 1967 and was appointed commanding officer of a nuclear submarine. In a few years' time, Makarov was promoted to Chief of Staff of a division of nuclear submarines in the Northern Fleet. Makarov would continue to rise through the ranks of Soviet navies, having obtained roles such as Deputy Head, 1st Deputy Commander of the Baltic Fleet (eventually becoming the commander of the Baltic Fleet), the Chief of the Main Navy Staff, and finally was promoted to Fleet Admiral in 1989. He retired from the navy in 1992, and died in 2011.

References
 В. Д. Доценко. Морской биографический словарь. Санкт-Петербург: «LOGOS», 1995. — С.262
 Военная энциклопедия в 8 томах. М.:Военное издательство, 1994–2004. — Т.5.

1931 births
2011 deaths
Russian military leaders
Soviet admirals
Soviet Navy personnel
Recipients of the Order of Lenin
Recipients of the Order of the Red Banner
Burials in Troyekurovskoye Cemetery